The 1887 Invercargill mayoral election was held on 30 November 1887.

The candidates were the same as at the by-election earlier in the year. Edwin Alfred Tapper was re-elected with an increased majority.

Results
The following table gives the election results:

References

1887 elections in New Zealand
Mayoral elections in Invercargill